Achromatic means literally “without color”. It may refer to: 

 Achromatic colors, “greys” or “neutral colors”, also black or white 
 Achromatic lens, a lens designed to minimize chromatic aberration
 Achromatic vision:
 Monochromacy (total color blindness)
 Achromatopsia
 Monochrome (disambiguation)